Hooper Eblen Center, often called The Hoop by students, is a 9,280-seat multi-purpose arena in on the campus of Tennessee Tech in Cookeville, Tennessee. Opened in 1977 and named for former TTU coach and professor Hooper Eblen, it is home to the TTU Golden Eagles basketball and volleyball teams. The building replaced Memorial Gym, a post-War gymnasium located on the quadrangle.

See also
 List of NCAA Division I basketball arenas

References

External links
Tennessee Technical University website
TTU Golden Eagles athletics website

Sports venues in Tennessee
College basketball venues in the United States
Indoor arenas in Tennessee
Buildings and structures in Putnam County, Tennessee
Tennessee Tech Golden Eagles men's basketball
1977 establishments in Tennessee
Basketball venues in Tennessee